Parliamentary elections were held in Mali on 20 July 1997, with a second round on 3 August. They followed the April elections, which had been annulled by the Constitutional Court due to "serious irregularities". The result was a victory for the Alliance for Democracy in Mali, which won 128 of the 147 seats elected in the country, a further 13 being elected by Malians living abroad. The elections were boycotted by the National Congress for Democratic Initiative, the Sudanese Union-African Democratic Rally, the Popular Movement for the Development of the Republic of West Africa, the Rally for Democracy and Progress, the Rally for Labour Democracy, the Union of Democratic Forces for Progress and the Malian Union for Democracy and Development. Voter turnout was just 21.6%.

Results

References

1997 in Mali
Mali
1997 07